Trerulefoot (pronounced , Cornish: Bentreriwall) is a village in southeast Cornwall, England, United Kingdom. It is located on the A38 trunk road approximately halfway between the towns of Saltash and Liskeard. Trerulefoot has a farm shop, two cafés and a petrol filling station.

References

External links

Villages in Cornwall